The Soviet submarine М-172 was a Malyutka-class (Series XII) short-range, diesel-powered attack submarine of the Soviet Navy. She was part of the Northern Fleet and operated during World War II against Axis shipping. Her commander was the Jewish Israel Fisanovich before he was moved to another vessel, where he died due to friendly fire.

Service history
M-172 served in the Northern Fleet, attacking Axis shipping in Norwegian waters. A number of attacks were done, but they resulted in just a single confirmed victory. M-172 departed for the last mission on 1 October 1943, never returning: it is likely she sunk on a German defensive barrage of naval mines.

References 

1937 ships
Soviet M-class submarines
Ships built in the Soviet Union
World War II submarines of the Soviet Union